Dan or Danny Long may refer to:

 Dan Long (producer), American music producer, recording engineer, and mixer
 Dan Long (baseball) (1867–1929), outfielder in Major League Baseball
 Daniel E. Long Jr., United States Army general
Danny Long (footballer), see 2012 FAI Cup
Danny Long (boxer), see Robbie Sims